John Hopps may refer to:
 John Hopps (physicist), American physicist and politician
 John Alexander Hopps, Canadian inventor of the artificial pacemaker
 John Page Hopps, Unitarian minister and spiritualist